Lucidity is the debut full-length album by the Dutch symphonic metal band, Delain. It was released on 4 September 2006 by Roadrunner Records. It was released in the US by Sensory Records on 22 June 2010. In 2016 the band celebrated their 10th anniversary by re-releasing the album.

After the disbandment of the band which had recorded the Amenity demo, the  keyboard player and main composer Martijn Westerholt decided to retain lead vocalist Charlotte Wessels and to record an album with the best session musicians available, without the perspective of bringing the songs on tour. He recruited for the project Marko Hietala on vocals and bass, Ad Sluijter, Guus Eikens and Jan Yrlund on guitars and Ariën van Weesenbeek on drums. Guest vocalists on the album were Sharon den Adel, Liv Kristine, and George Oosthoek.

The album was recorded in different periods during 2005 and 2006 to accommodate the availability of the many musicians involved, often on tour with their bands.
 
Lucidity peaked at No. 43 in Dutch charts and the success of the album pushed Westerholt to reorganize Delain as a touring band with new musicians.

In 2021, it was elected by Metal Hammer as the 20th best symphonic metal album.

Track listing

Personnel
Band members
Charlotte Wessels - lead vocals (except tracks 4 and 10)
Martijn Westerholt - keyboards, orchestral arrangements, co-producer

Session musicians
Marko Hietala - lead vocals on tracks 1, 4, 7, 8, 10, bass guitar on all tracks
Ad Sluijter - guitar on tracks 1, 2, 4, 9, 10
Guus Eikens - guitar on tracks 3, 6, 7, 8, 11, keyboards on track 7, backing vocals on tracks 1, 2, 7, 8, 10, 11
Ariën van Weesenbeek - drums
Rosan van der Aa - backing vocals on tracks 1, 2, 7, 8, 10, 11

Guest musicians

Sharon den Adel - lead vocals on track 4
Liv Kristine - lead vocals on tracks 5 and 10
George Oosthoek - grunts on tracks 3, 11, 12
Jan Yrlund - guitar on tracks 1, 4, 5
Oliver Phillips - guitar on track 4, orchestral arrangements, producer
Rupert Gillett - cello on tracks 3, 4, 5

Touring members
Ronald Landa - guitars, backing vocals
Rob van der Loo - bass
Sander Zoer - drums

Technical personnel
Christian Moos, Tero Kinnunen, Daniël Gibson, Alexander Krull - engineers
Stefan Helleblad - mixing
Thomas Eberger - mastering

References

External links 
 Metallum Archives

2006 debut albums
Delain albums
Roadrunner Records albums
Symphonic metal albums by Dutch artists